Schneersohn (or Schneerson) is a Jewish surname used by many of the descendants of the Rabbi Shneur Zalman of Liadi, the first Rebbe of the Chabad-Lubavitch Hasidic movement.

Origins
Rabbi Shneur Zalman of Liadi (1745 – 1812), founded the Chabad Hasidic movement in 1775. His son, Rabbi Dovber Schneuri (1773 – 1827), the second Chabad Rebbe, adopted the "Schneuri" surname after his father's first name. The first to use the "Schneersohn" surname was Rabbi Menachem Mendel Schneersohn, the nephew/son-in-law of Rabbi Dovber and the grandson of Rabbi Schneur Zalman and the third Chabad Rebbe.

Persons with the surname Schneersohn

Chabad Rebbes
 Rabbi Menachem Mendel Schneersohn (1789 – 1866), the third Chabad-Lubavitch Rebbe
 Rabbi Shmuel Schneersohn (1834 – 1882), the fourth Chabad-Lubavitch Rebbe
 Rabbi Sholom Dovber Schneersohn (1860 – 1920), the fifth Chabad-Lubavitch Rebbe
 Rabbi Yosef Yitzchok Schneersohn (1880 – 1950), the sixth Chabad-Lubavitch Rebbe
 Rabbi Menachem Mendel Schneerson (1902 – 1994), the seventh Chabad-Lubavitch Rebbe

Rebbes of Chabad offshoots
 Rabbi Yehuda Leib Schneersohn (1811 – 1866), the second son of third Chabad and the founder and first rebbe of the Kopust-Chabad offshoot dynasty
 Rabbi Shlomo Zalman Schneersohn (1830 – 1900), the second rebbe of the Kopust-Chabad dynasty
 Rabbi Shmaryahu Noah Schneersohn (1842 – 1924), the third rebbe of the Kopust-Chabad dynasty
 Rabbi Chaim Schneur Zalman Schneersohn (d. 1879), the son of third Chabad and the founder and first rebbe of the Liadi-Chabad offshoot dynasty
 Rabbi Yitzchak Dovber Schneersohn, the second rebbe of the Liadi-Chabad dynasty

Others
 Chaya Mushka Schneersohn (d. 1860), the wife of Rabbi Menachem Mendel Schneersohn, the third Chabad rebbe
 Rabbi Levi Yitzchak Schneerson (1878 – 1944), a Kabbalist, rabbi of Dnepropetrovsk and the father of Rabbi Menachem Mendel Schneerson, the seventh Chabad rebbe
 Chana Schneerson (1880 – 1964), the mother of the seventh Chabad rebbe.
 Rabbi Isaac Schneersohn (1879 or 1881(?) – 1969), a French rabbi, industrialist, founder of the first Holocaust Archives and Memorial.
 Rabbi Yaakov-Leib Schneersohn Salzman (1879 – 1941), Polish rabbi in Poland (Pystin); died during Holocaust in Auschwitz
 René Yitzhak-Lev Baduel Schneersohn Salzman (1921 – 1991), the son of Rabbi Yaakov Leib Schneerson Salzman
 Jean-Claude Abraham-Leib Baduel Schneersohn Salzman (1948 - ), indistrualist, the first Chabad-Lubavitch Rebbe dynasty
 Antoine Ethan-Lev Baduel Schneersohn Salzman (1971 – ), President and CEO of Radio FG, radio presenter, the first Chabad-Lubavitch Rebbe dynasty
 Sarah-Lev Galland Schneersohn Salzman (1975 – ), model, television and radio presenter, the first Chabad-Lubavitch Rebbe dynasty
 Jean-Etienne Yaakov-Lev Baduel Schneersohn Salzman (1978 – ), CEO of Radio FG, the first Chabad-Lubavitch Rebbe dynasty
 Alexandre Yitzhak-Leib Baduel Schneersohn Salzman (2010 – ), the first Chabad-Lubavitch Rebbe dynasty
 Rabbi Schneour Zalman Schneersohn (1898 – 1980), a French Hasidic Rabbi.
 Chaya Mushka Schneersohn (1901 – 1988), the wife of Rabbi Menachem Mendel, the seventh Chabad rebbe
 Sheina Horenstein (d. 1942), born Sheina Schneersohn, the daughter of Rabbi Yosef Yitzchak, the sixth rebbe
 Menucha Rochel Slonim (1798–1888), the daughter of Rabbi Dovber, the second rebbe. Leader and pioneer of the Hebron community in Israel. 
 Shmuel Schneursohn, a leader in the underground Zionist movement Hechalutz in the Soviet Union from 1922 to 1928.
 Zelda Schneersohn Mishkovsky (1914 – 1984), an Israeli poet, widely known as Zelda

References 

Jewish surnames
Schneersohn family
Yiddish-language surnames